Georgina García Pérez was the defending champion, but chose to participate at the 2019 Burnie International instead.

Rebecca Šramková won the title, defeating Audrey Albié in the final, 6–2, 6–7(4–7), 6–2.

Seeds

Draw

Finals

Top half

Bottom half

References
Main Draw

Engie Open Andrézieux-Bouthéon 42 - Singles